is a Japanese American businessman, venture capitalist and former advisor to the government of Japan specializing in cybersecurity.

Early life and education 
Saito was born in Los Angeles, California; his parents immigrated to the US from Japan in 1969, two years before he was born. He is the eldest of three children.

In 1987, Saito graduated from Damien High School in La Verne, California. He attended the University of California, Riverside from the Fall of 1988 to the Fall 1992, and was a student in Riverside's joint Biomedical Science Program with the University of California, Los Angeles in 1988.

Career 
Saito began a computer security venture while in junior high school, and incorporated the firm as I/O Software in 1991 while attending university. Among other technologies, I/O Software developed a system to display Japanese characters in software written in English, and a fingerprint recognition system used by Sony. Microsoft began a partnership with I/O Software in 2000 to adopt the latter's authentication technology in future versions of Microsoft Windows. Saito sold the I/O Software business assets to Microsoft in 2004.

After selling the I/O Software business, he moved to Japan, where he became active as a venture capitalist and invested in several Japanese start-ups. He was named a Young Global Leader of the World Economic Forum in 2011.

Saito was an advisor to Prime Minister Shinzo Abe on cybersecurity issues. Saito accompanied Abe on a 2015 visit to Silicon Valley, where Abe met with the heads of several major technology firms. He was  a cybersecurity advisor to the Cabinet Office from 2013 and an advisor to the Ministry of Economy, Trade and Industry until revelations that led to his admission that he misrepresented his education and academic degrees came to light and he resigned these and other posts in 2017.

In May 2019, Saito took a legal action in the Tokyo regional court against Kodansha which published the Shukan Gendai magazine (published on 3 March 2018). Kodansha paid a settlement and deleted the article at the request of the court.

Works and publications

References

External links 

 

Living people
1971 births
Japanese businesspeople
University of California, Riverside alumni